This list of lost fossil sites is a list of localities in which abundant, well-preserved, or scientifically significant fossils were once found but are no longer available due to the destruction, inaccessibility or overcollection of the fossils preserved therein.

The list

See also
 List of lost, damaged, or destroyed dinosaur specimens

Paleontological sites
Paleontology lists